The 2023 BWF World Junior Championships, is the twenty-third edition of the BWF World Junior Championships. It will be held in Honolulu, Hawaii, United States.

Host city selection
Honolulu was awarded the event in November 2018 during the announcement of 18 major badminton event hosts from 2019 to 2025.

References

International sports competitions hosted by the United States
Badminton tournaments in the United States
Sports in Honolulu
21st century in Honolulu
BWF World Junior Championships
BWF World Junior
BWF World Junior
BWF World Junior Championships
Badminton World Junior Championships